Lynd may refer to:

People
 Helen Lynd (1896–1982), American sociologist and author
 James Lynd (1830–1862), American state senator
 Laurie Lynd (born 1959), Canadian screenwriter and director
 Robert Staughton Lynd (1892–1970), American sociologist and professor
 Robert Wilson Lynd (1879–1949), Irish writer
 Staughton Lynd (1929-2022), American activist
 Sylvia Lynd (1888–1952), English poet
 William Earl Lynd (1955–2008), American murderer

Places

United States
 Lynd, Minnesota, a small city
 Lynd Township, Lyon County, Minnesota

Other
 Vesper Lynd, fictional character in the James Bond universe

See also
 Lind
 Lynde